Sastha Sunu is a noted Indonesian film editor who has worked on several of Indonesia's most prominent films since 2001.
In 2002 he edited the film Ca-bau-kan and in 2005 Gie.

Filmography

 Ca Bau Kan (2001)
 Sebuah Pertanyaan untuk Cinta (2002)
 Eliana, Eliana (2002)
 Rumah Ketujuh (2003)
 Untukmu (2003)
 Eiffel I'm in Love (2003)
 Eiffel I'm in Love Extended Version (2004)
 Mengejar Matahari (2004)
 Impian Kemarau atau "The Rainmaker" (2004)
 Tentang Dia (2005)		
 Ungu Violet (2005)	
 Vina Bilang Cinta (2005) -- supervisor editor
 Gie (2005)
 Untuk Rena (2005)
 Apa Artinya Cinta? (2005)
 Long Road to Heaven (2007)
 D'Bijis (2007)
 3 Hari Untuk Selamanya (2007)
 Anak-Anak Borobudur (2007)
 The Photograph (2007)
 Merah Itu Cinta (2007)
 Legenda Sundel Bolong (2007)
 Ayat-Ayat Cinta (2008)
 Drop Out (2008)
 3 Doa 3 Cinta (film) (2008)
 Jamila dan Sang Presiden (2009)
 Merah Putih (2009)
 Merah Putih 2: Darah Garuda (2010)	
 Merah Putih 3: Hati Merdeka (2011)
 Metamorphoblues—The Story of Slank & Slankers (2011)
 Surat Kecil untuk Tuhan (2011)
 Dilema (2012)
 5 cm (film) (2012)
 Hasduk Berpola (2013)
 Java Heat (2013) -- additional editor
 308 (2013)
 Moga Bunda Disayang Allah (2013)
 Tenggelamnya Kapal Van der Wijck (film) (2013)
 Tenggelamnya Kapal Van der Wijck (film) Extended Version (2013)
 Sebelum Pagi Terulang Kembali (2014)
 Supernova (2014)
 Jenderal Soedirman (2015)

External links and sources 

Indonesian film editors
Living people
1963 births